Macrobrochis alba is a moth of the family Erebidae. It was described by Fang in 1990. It is found in Yunnan, China.

References

Lithosiina
Moths described in 1990